The 2017 ITM Auckland SuperSprint was a motor racing event for Supercars, held on the weekend of 3 to 5 November 2017. The event was held at Pukekohe Park Raceway near Pukekohe, New Zealand, and consisted of two races, 200 kilometres in length. It was the 13th event of fourteen in the 2017 Supercars Championship and hosted Races 23 and 24 of the season. It was the twelfth running of the Auckland SuperSprint.

Background

Driver changes
Alex Rullo was replaced at Lucas Dumbrell Motorsport with Jack Perkins.

Report

Practice

Race 23

Qualifying 
Qualifying for Race 23 was abandoned due to torrential rain. Because of this, the grid was set as per the results of second practice, thereby giving Cameron Waters pole position.

The following times were set in the second practice, which set the grid for Race 23.

Race

Race 24

Qualifying

Race

References

Auckland SuperSprint
2017 in New Zealand motorsport
Auckland SuperSprint